The New Hampshire Governor's Mansion, known as "Bridges House", is the official residence of the governor of New Hampshire and the governor's family. Bridges House, located at 21 Mountain Road in Concord, the capital of New Hampshire, has served as the governor's official residence since 1969.  Built in 1836, it was listed on the National Register of Historic Places in December 2005, and the New Hampshire State Register of Historic Places in July 2005.

Description and history
It is set on eleven landscaped acres, with views toward downtown Concord, Rattlesnake Hill, and the Merrimack River valley. The house is a  story brick building, with a side gable roof and end chimneys. It is oriented facing south, with a five-bay front facade. The main entrance is at the center, flanked by sidelight windows and topped by an entablature and granite lintel. Windows are set in rectangular openings, with granite sills, and granite lintels on the first floor windows. The street-facing east facade has a pedimented brick gable with a deep recess at the center and ogee crown moulding along the rake edge.

The house was built by Charles Graham about 1836.  It is a particularly early example in the state of Greek Revival architecture executed in brick, a building material that was only then beginning to come into wider use for home construction in central New Hampshire.  Styles Bridges, governor of New Hampshire (1935–37) and U.S. senator for 25 years thereafter, lived here from 1946 until his death. Bequeathed to the state upon the death of his widow Doloris Bridges, in 1969 it became the governor's official residence.

Not all governors live in the mansion during their tenure.  Recent examples include John Lynch, a resident of nearby Hopkinton, and Maggie Hassan, a resident of Exeter, who resided instead on the campus of Phillips Exeter Academy where her husband, Thomas Hassan, served as principal.

See also
National Register of Historic Places listings in Merrimack County, New Hampshire
New Hampshire Historical Marker No. 67: Bridges House-Governor's Residence
Warren Brown (politician) (1836–1919), who constructed a house in North Hampton, New Hampshire, colloquially known as "the Governor's mansion"

References

External links
 Friends of Bridges House

Governors' mansions in the United States
Houses on the National Register of Historic Places in New Hampshire
Government buildings on the National Register of Historic Places in New Hampshire
Houses in Concord, New Hampshire
Houses completed in 1836
New Hampshire State Register of Historic Places
National Register of Historic Places in Concord, New Hampshire
Governor of New Hampshire